Essex is the name of a county in England, named after the ancient Kingdom of Essex. A number of places and things have been named after it.

People 
 Essex (surname)
 Earl of Essex, the English Earls of Essex

Places

Place names

In Canada
 Essex (electoral district)
 Essex, Ontario
 Essex County, Ontario

In the United Kingdom
 Essex (UK Parliament constituency)

In the United States
 Essex, San Bernardino County, California
 Essex, Connecticut
 Essex, Illinois
 Essex, Iowa
 Essex, Maryland
 Essex, Massachusetts, a New England town
 Essex (CDP), Massachusetts, the main village in the town
 Essex, Montana
 Essex, Missouri
 Essex, New York
 Essex, North Carolina
 Essex, Ohio
 Essex, Vermont
 Essex County, Massachusetts
 Essex County, New Jersey
 Essex County, New York
 Essex County, Vermont
 Essex County, Virginia
 Essex Township, Michigan (in Clinton County)
 Essexville, Michigan (in Bay County)

Structures
Essex Crossing, a Manhattan redevelopment project
 Essex Reef Light, was a light in Essex, Connecticut on the Connecticut River

Transportation-related 
Essex station (disambiguation), stations of the name
Essex Street (disambiguation), streets of the same name.

Art, entertainment, and media
 Essex (album), a 1994 album by Alison Moyet
 Essex Records, a record label
 The Essex, a 1960s American R&B vocal group
 The Only Way Is Essex A British sitcom TV show.

Motor vehicles
 Essex (automobile) or Essex Motor Car, an affiliate of Hudson Motors, 1919–1932
 Ford Essex V4 engine
 Ford Essex V6 engine (disambiguation)

Ships
 Essex (ship), any of several civilian ships
 Essex (whaleship), a whaler commanded by Captain George Pollard, Jr., that a sperm whale rammed and sank in 1820
 HMS Essex, five ships of the Royal Navy
 USS Essex, five ships of the US Navy
 Essex class aircraft carrier, named for the lead ship

Fictional
 HMS Essex, a fictional Royal Navy warship from the 2017 film Pirates of the Caribbean: Dead Men Tell No Tales

Other uses
Essex (pig), a breed of domestic pig
Essex, a brand of piano designed by Steinway & Sons
Essex girl, a British stereotype
Essex man, a British stereotype
Essex Overseas Petroleum Corporation, a former oil trading company owned by David Thieme
University of Essex